The EBSA European Under-18 Snooker Championships is an amateur junior snooker tournament. The event series is sanctioned by the European Billiards and Snooker Association and started from 2016. The inaugural tournament was won by Tyler Rees who defeated fellow countryman Jackson Page 5–2 in the final. The winner of the tournament is awarded with a place in the qualifying rounds of the World Snooker Championship.

Winners

Men's

Statistics

Champions by country

See also
 EBSA European Snooker Championship
 EBSA European Under-21 Snooker Championships
 IBSF World Under-18 Snooker Championship
 World Snooker Tour

References

Snooker amateur competitions
Recurring sporting events established in 2016
2016 establishments in Poland
EBSA Under-18 Championship
Snooker, under-18
Under-18 sport